Koinonia may refer to:

Koinonia, a Greek word
Koinonia (band), a Christian jazz band
Koinonia Christian Fellowship, a church in Bloomingdale, Ontario
Koinonia Partners, an intentional community in Sumter County, Georgia
Koinonia Community, a humanitarian organization in Africa
Airdrie Koinonia Christian School, in Airdrie, Alberta